Jane M. Carlton is a biologist at New York University whose research centers on the genomics of two groups of single-celled parasites: those which cause malaria (the genus Plasmodium), and  trichomonads, which include the common sexually transmitted parasite Trichomonas vaginalis.

Education 
Carlton received her Ph.D. in genetics at the University of Edinburgh, Scotland, and has worked at several scientific institutions in the U.S., including the National Center for Biotechnology Information at the National Institutes of Health and the Institute for Genomic Research (TIGR).

Research 
Carlton is among a group of scientists recording and categorizing changes in all of the malaria parasite's genes at once, with a view toward detecting drug resistance in its earliest stages while it can still be controlled, finding new vulnerabilities in the parasite's genome that can be exploited to fight malaria. As Faculty Director of Genomic Sequencing at NYU's Center for Genomics and Systems Biology, Carlton is examining the genomes of dozens of malaria isolates at a time. Recently her group sequenced several genomes from both a human malaria species (Plasmodium vivax) and a closely related monkey malaria parasite (Plasmodium cynomolgi), producing a more detailed picture of malaria evolution and uncovering a surprising amount of genetic variation in the latter.

Carlton collaborates with scientists at National Institute of Malaria Research in India to develop new research paths and control strategies for the disease there. As Program Director of a seven-year NIH International Center of Excellence in Malaria Research based jointly in New Delhi and NYU, she heads the first pan-Indian genomic survey of malaria parasite strains, along with an in-depth epidemiological study of how the malaria is transmitted and manifests itself in different ecologies and societies in India.

Trichomonads are single-celled parasites that infect humans and other mammals as well as birds. One such parasite is Trichomonas vaginalis, which causes the most widespread non-viral human STD). Carlton led the group that sequenced the genome of Trichomonas vaginalis in 2007 – the first sequencing of any trichomonad genome – and uncovered families of genes that may be responsible for the membrane irritation and damage associated with trichomoniasis. The sequencing project also revealed that the parasite's genome is surprisingly large and composed mostly of highly repetitive ‘mobile’ DNA elements.

Awards and honors 
Carlton has published more than 139 research articles and reviews.

She was the recipient of the Stoll-Stunkard Memorial Lectureship Award from the American Society of Parasitologists in 2010.

She was elected a Fellow of the American Association for the Advancement of Science in 2012.

References

New York University faculty
American women biologists
Living people
Year of birth missing (living people)
Women parasitologists
American parasitologists
Malariologists
American women academics
21st-century American women